The Porcelain Tour was a 19 date concert tour by Matt Cardle in support of his 2013 album Porcelain.  It took place over Ireland and the UK through April 2014, ending in Telford on 25 April.

Background

The tour was announced on 30 October 2013, with tickets on general sale on 4 November 2013.
  The tour began on 1 April 2014 in Belfast, followed by one date in Ireland then moving to Scotland and England.  Cardle played guitar and was backed by a live band.  He was joined by Melanie C on three shows to perform their duet Loving You.

Reception

Joe Hoffman of The Upcoming gave 5 out of 5 stars for the show saying "He is an unbelievable musical talent, and he did not fail to bring it all to a sold out show last night at Shepherd’s Bush Empire" and "Cardle’s voice is incredible, with a falsetto that can send shivers down your spine."  Ann Clarkson from Native Monster gave it a favourable review saying "The vocals sounded effortless, which is a hard trick to pull off when you have a massive four-octave range and use most of that during one evening."

Setlist
Your Kind Of Love
Starlight
All For Nothing
The Fire
In Chains
Not Over You
Faithless
When We Collide
Water (Belfast only)
Lately (Belfast and London only)
It's Only Love (Performed as encore in London)
Hit My Heart
Letters
When You Were My Girl
This Trouble Is Ours
Porcelain

Encore:
Loving You (Performed with Mel C in Manchester, Liverpool and London)

Tour dates

References

2014 concert tours